The southern sleeper shark or Whitley's sleeper shark (Somniosus antarcticus) is a deepwater benthopelagic sleeper shark of the family Somniosidae found in the southern Atlantic, Indian, and Pacific Oceans.

Taxonomy
It was formerly sometimes viewed as conspecific with either the Greenland shark (Somniosus microcephalus), or the Pacific sleeper shark (Somniosus pacificus).

Habitat
It is known from depths of 400 to 1,100 m.

Description
The southern sleeper shark differs from S. microcephalus in having more tooth rows in the lower jaw, a shorter interdorsal region, a more posterior first dorsal fin, and fewer precaudal vertebrae, and from both species in having lower dorsal fins.

Diet
It feeds primarily on cephalopods, especially squid- including the Giant and colossal squids- and fish; its stomach contents also less commonly contain remains of marine mammals and birds. Based on its generally sluggish nature and the speed of its prey, it is thought to be an ambush predator. This dogfish is sometimes taken as bycatch in the orange roughy and Patagonian toothfish fisheries; whether this poses a threat to the species is currently unknown.

Conservation status 
In June 2018 the New Zealand Department of Conservation classified the southern sleeper shark as "Not Threatened" with the qualifiers "Data Poor" and "Uncertain whether Secure Overseas" under the New Zealand Threat Classification System. The IUCN also does not regard it as threatened, noting a widespread distribution and no indication of a declining population, but believes it is not naturally abundant and that much more data and understanding of its population, interactions and biology is needed.

References

Somniosus
Fish described in 1939
Fish of the Atlantic Ocean
Fish of the Indian Ocean
Fish of the Pacific Ocean
Taxonomy articles created by Polbot